Greatrakes is a surname. Notable people with the surname include:

Valentine Greatrakes (1628–1683), Irish faith healer
William Greatrakes (1723?–1781), Irish barrister

See also
Greatorex
Greatrex